Roderick Weir "R.W." Home (born 6 January 1939), is an Australian academic and historian of Science. Home has been Professor of History and Philosophy of Science, University of Melbourne from 1975 to 2002 on his retirement. Previously he was lecturer and then senior lecturer in the Department of History and Philosophy of Science.

He was Foundation Director of the Australian Science Archives Project (ASAP) 1985-96 and Chairman of its National Advisory Board. The work of ASAP is now carried on by the Australian Science and Technology Heritage Centre, a leading centre for the online documentation of the history of Australian science and technology. Professor Home is a prolific author, with major historical works to his credit; for example, documenting the scientific achievements of Ferdinand von Mueller, the German-Austrian scientist who was appointed Government Botanist for Victoria by Governor Charles La Trobe in 1853.

Career highlights

Educated at the University of Melbourne (BSc), and Indiana University (PhD), DLitt. Physics Master, Haileybury College 1960–64.
Lecturer, Department of History and Philosophy of Science, University of Melbourne 1967–70, Senior Lecturer 1970–75, Professor 1975–2002.
President, Australasian Association for the History, Philosophy and Social Studies of Science 1977–80. Fellow of the Australian Academy of the Humanities and a Corresponding Member of the International Academy of the History of Science.
 Editor, Historical Records of Australian Science 1984-.
 Foundation Director of Australian Science Archives Project 1985-96 and Chairman of its National Advisory Board.

Although Professor Home retired from the University of Melbourne in December 2002, he continues to play a leading role in documenting and preserving the history of Australian science as Editor of the Historical Records of Australian Science (HRAS), the journal of record for the history of science, pure and applied, in Australia and the southwest Pacific.

References

External links
Department of History and Philosophy of Science, University of Melbourne
Australian Science Archives Project (ASAP)
Historical Records of Australian Science (HRAS)
R.W.Home: Archival Holdings
R.W.Home: Brief Biography
R.W.Home: Published Works

1939 births
People educated at Haileybury (Melbourne)
Australian historians
Fellows of the Australian Academy of the Humanities
Historians of science
Living people
Academic staff of the University of Melbourne